The Portuguese Basketball Cup (Portuguese: Taça de Portugal de Basquetebol) is the top-tier level men's professional national club basketball cup competition in Portugal. It is organized by the Portuguese Basketball Federation (Federação Portuguesa de Basquetebol).

Portuguese Cup finals

Portuguese Cup winners

References

Cup, Portuguese Basketball
Basketball cup competitions in Europe